George Azzi (born 5 May 1982) is a former professional rugby league player. A prop and second-row forward, Azzi represented Lebanon internationally between 2002 and 2006, scoring four tries in five matches. He also made one appearance for the Sydney Roosters during the 2002 NRL season.

References

1982 births
Living people
Lebanon national rugby league team players
Sydney Roosters players
Rugby league props
Rugby league second-rows